List of Registered Historic Places in Washtenaw County, Michigan.

|}

See also

 List of Michigan State Historic Sites in Washtenaw County, Michigan
 List of National Historic Landmarks in Michigan
 National Register of Historic Places listings in Michigan
 Listings in neighboring counties: Ingham, Jackson, Lenawee, Livingston, Monroe, Oakland, Wayne

References

Washtenaw County
Washtenaw County, Michigan